Ordinaire is the first EP by the pop band Stepdad. It was self-released on April 24, 2010 through Bandcamp, and re-released on September 6, 2011 by Quite Scientific Records.

The entire EP was recorded and mixed in Ryan McCarthy's bedroom.

The lead single, "My Leather, My Fur, My Nails", was named the seventh best song of the year by The Pop Sucker's top songs of 2010.

Track listing

Notes
The songs, "Find Love" and "Magic Stones", only appear on the re-released version of the EP.

References

2011 EPs
Stepdad (band) albums